Shivananda Lahari (IAST ) is a devotional hymn composed by Adi Shankara,  Advaita philosopher, on Shiva. It literally means Wave of Auspicious Bliss. It consists of one hundred stanzas of Sanskrit poetry in various chandas (metres). It was composed by Adi Shankara while staying in Srisailam, a pilgrimage town, in Kurnool district of Andhra Pradesh. It begins with an ode to Mallikarjuna and Bhramarambika, the deities at Srisailam.

Shivananda Lahari was translated into Telugu language with word-to-word explanation by Balijepalli Lakshmikantham Kavi and published in 1916.

See also
 Adi Shankara bibliography
 Soundarya Lahari

References

External links
 

Hindu devotional texts
8th-century works
Hymns
Shaiva texts
Sanskrit poetry
Adi Shankara
Advaita Vedanta texts